LifeLight Festival was an annual free outdoor Christian music festival held over Labor Day weekend on a farm near Worthing, South Dakota, which is 12 miles south of Sioux Falls, South Dakota.

History
LifeLight Festival was started by Alan and Vicki Greene in 1998 as an afternoon concert on a local church lawn, drawing about 2,000 people.  By 2001, the festival was moved to the W.H. Lyons Fairgrounds in Sioux Falls to accommodate the growing crowds.  In 2002, attendance tripled from the year before, growing to 32,000 attendees over a 3-day weekend.  LifeLight has since grown to over 320,000 attendees over a 3-day weekend, expanding to 6 stages, with a budget of nearly $700,000 each year. After outgrowing previous locations, the LifeLight festival found a new permanent home for the Festival on a family farm near Worthing, South Dakota.  The 2010 Festival was the first at the new location.  It is a free concert but provides a great economic boost to Sioux Falls. Festivals like this one said to bring up to $10 Million. 
Since 2005, LifeLight has also sponsored spring and fall tours featuring LifeLight artists. They started as local tours with primarily local artists but over the years, LifeLight Tours has partnered with several national and regional bands/speakers and now travel well beyond the Midwest for tour dates.  Past tours have featured artists John Reuben, Brian Welch, Sanctus Real,  Phil Joel, Disciple, Project 86, Children 18:3 and many more and traveled to cities in Texas, Illinois, Nebraska, Colorado, Minnesota, Iowa, and South Dakota as well as other states. The 2013 festival in South Dakota hosted main showings of Plumb, Newsboys, Audio Adrenaline, and Skillet.

No festival was held in 2020.

Attendance
1998: 1,500
1999: 4,000
2000: 6,500
2001: 10,000
2002: 32,000
2003: 110,000
2004: 240,000
2005: 275,000
2006: 263,000
2007: 320,000
2008: 320,000
2009: 270,000
2010: 320,000

Artists

2013 Festival
 For Today
 Plumb
 The Red Jumpsuit Apparatus
 Levi the Poet
 Flyleaf
 Building 429
 Newsboys
 Rhett Walker Band
 Audio Adrenaline
 Fireflight
 We Are Leo
 Phinehas
 Unarmed For Victory
 At The Wayside
 Aaron Gillespie
 Children 18:3
 The City Harmonic
 One Accord
 Sean Michel
 Ravenhill
 Spencer Kane
 From The Eyes of Servants
 Love Out Loud
 John Reuben
 Je'kob
 Shuree
 Disciple
 Lybecker
 Tru Serva
 Double Vision
 Grant Lockner
 Rapture Ruckus

2012 Festival
Tenth Avenue North
Skillet
Peter Furler
Five Iron Frenzy
House of Heroes
Sanctus Real
Leeland
Mandisa
Christy Nockels
Downhere
Run Kid Run
The City Harmonic
Remedy Drive
Becoming the Archetype
Andy Mineo
Aaron Gillespie
Everyday Sunday
Abandon Kansas
Sleeping Giant
KB
John Rueben
The Wedding
Wolves at the Gate
Children 18:3
Jenny & Tyler
Write This Down
Love & Death
One Sonic Society
These Hearts
Matt Hammitt
GoFish
Silverline
Stephanie Smith
Kiros
Everfound
Fades Away
We Are Leo
Ilia
Willet
An Epic No Less
George Moss
The Skies Revolt
Loftland
Classic Petra
Broken Walls
Marah in the Mainsail
Triple Stitch
Brandon Reid
Alan Greene
Rachelle Hope
Brian Sumner
Tom Henderson
Josh Brewer

2011 Festival
Main Stage:
Relient K
Tenth Avenue North
Jeremy Camp
Sidewalk Prophets
Britt Nicole
Manafest
Hawk Nelson
Fireflight
Manic Drive
-Souled Out Stage:
Disciple
Blindside
Write This Down
Children 18:3
The Wedding

2010 Festival
Abandon 
BarlowGirl
Brian "Head" Welch
Children 18:3
Colossus
David Crowder Band
Day of Fire
Disciple
Eric Timm
Everyday Sunday
Family Force 5
From The Eyes Of Servants
House of Heroes
John Mark McMillan
John Reuben
Kari Jobe
MercyMe
Mikeschair
Parachute Band
Reilly
Seabird
Showbread
Silverline
Spoken 
These Hearts
The Overseer
Triple Stitch and More 
White Collar Sideshow
Willet
Write This Down

2009 Festival
A Life Echoed
Children 18:3
David Lunsford
DecembeRadio
Disciple
Downhere
Esterlyn (band)
Everyday Sunday
Everfound
Family Force 5
FM Static
House of Heroes
John Reuben
Krystal Meyers
Kutless
Life's Breath
Lincoln Brewster
Manic Drive
Michael Gungor Band
Nevertheless
Newsboys
Remedy Drive
Run Kid Run
Rush of Fools
Sanctus Real
Sarah Reeves
Seventh Day Slumber
ShowbreadSilverline
Spoken
Stellar Kart
Superchick
Thousand Foot Krutch
Tenth Avenue North
The Switch Kids
The Wedding
TruEmotion
VOTA
WILLET

2008 Festival
Headliners of the 2008 festival, as announced on Life 96.5, were Switchfoot, Michael W. Smith and Casting Crowns. Other 2008 participating bands included:

33Miles
Ayiesha Woods
As I Lay Dying
Building 429
Day of Fire
Everyday Sunday
Family Force 5
Grits
John Reuben
Leeland
Lincoln Brewster
Matthew West
MxPx
Natalie Grant
Phil Joel
Remedy Drive
Sanctus Real
Seventh Day Slumber
Showbread
The Afters
This Beautiful Republic
VOTA

2007 Festival
Jars of Clay, TobyMac and Chris Tomlin were announced as the headliners of the 2007 festival.  
Other major bands and artists for 2007 included:
Anberlin
BarlowGirl
Big Daddy Weave
Casting Pearls
Family Force 5
Leeland
Tait
Phil Joel
Project 86
Stellar Kart

Previous Bands/Speakers
Audio Adrenaline
Casting Crowns
Day of Fire
Dr. James Dobson
FFH
GoFish
Jeremy Camp
Mark Schultz
Newsboys
Pillar
Point of Grace
Rebecca St. James
Relient K
Rick Warren
Salvador
Sanctus Real
Skillet
Steven Curtis Chapman
Superchick
Switchfoot
Third Day
Thousand Foot Krutch
Three Cord Wonder
Tree63

References

Christian music festivals
Companies based in South Dakota
Music festivals in South Dakota
Tourist attractions in Minnehaha County, South Dakota